State Route 800 (SR 800) is a north–south state highway in the eastern portion of the U.S. state of Ohio. Its southern terminus is at SR 7 in Jackson Township near New Matamoras, and its northern terminus is at its interchange with Interstate 77 in Canton.

Prior to 1969, SR 800 was part of SR 8.  At that time, SR 8 between Akron and Canton was eliminated.  The portion south of Canton was renumbered to SR 800.

History
Most of SR 800 was first designated in 1923 as SR 48 south of Dennison and SR 8 north of Dennison. By 1927, the road from Fly to Dennison became a southern extension of SR 8. Except for a realignment onto the US 250 expressway between Dennison and New Philadelphia in the 1960s, no major changes to the routing of SR 8 occurred between 1927 and 1969.

In May 1968, the Ohio Department of Highways (predecessor to Ohio Department of Transportation) proposed the renumbering of SR 8 to SR 800. The renumbering took place to avoid long conflicts with the newly constructed Interstate Highway System in Ohio. SR 800 signs began appearing along the road in February 1969 with a six-month transition allowing for the removal of old SR 8 signs. The renumbering coincided with the renumbering of a section of SR 16 in the New Philadelphia area (it became SR 416). Except for a realignment of the route around the north side of Dennison by 1979, no other changes have occurred to SR 800's routing.

Major intersections

References

External links

800
Transportation in Monroe County, Ohio
Transportation in Belmont County, Ohio
Transportation in Guernsey County, Ohio
Transportation in Harrison County, Ohio
Transportation in Tuscarawas County, Ohio
Transportation in Stark County, Ohio